The 2001–02 Slovenian Second League season started on 12 August and ended on 26 May 2002. Each team played a total of 30 matches. Renče merged with Brda before the season.

League standing

See also
2001–02 Slovenian PrvaLiga
2001–02 Slovenian Third League

References
NZS archive

External links
Football Association of Slovenia 

Slovenian Second League seasons
2001–02 in Slovenian football
Slovenia